The Cabinet of Dr. Ramirez is a 1991 silent film directed by Peter Sellars and starring Mikhail Baryshnikov, Joan Cusack and Peter Gallagher. It is a loose remake of The Cabinet of Dr. Caligari. However, the storyline was created as the film was being made, so it has few similarities with the original film. The film was screened only at the 1992 Sundance Film Festival and never theatrically released.

Cast
Mikhail Baryshnikov as Cesar
Joan Cusack as Cathy
Peter Gallagher as Matt
Ron Vawter as Dr. Ramirez
Kate Valk as Sue

References

External links
 

American silent feature films
British silent feature films
French silent feature films
German silent feature films
Films without speech
Silent films in color
1990s American films